The United States Air Forces in Europe (USAFE) Warrior Preparation Center is located at Einsiedlerhof Air Station, Germany (near Ramstein Air Base). It provides combat readiness training for USAFE forces with advanced simulation software.

It forms part of the 86th Mission Support Group of the 86th Airlift Wing, located at Ramstein Air Base.

The center's mission is to provide combat readiness training for United States Air Forces Europe (USAFE) forces.  The center supports Tier 1 through Tier 4 training  (Strategic through Tactical) via the Distributed Training Center connecting with other bases throughout the world.  These missions are accomplished with advanced simulation software.

History
The USAFE Warrior Preparation Center was founded in 1983 by Colonel "Moody" Suter, who also developed the Air Force's Red Flag exercises, at Einsiedlerhof Air Station, Germany.  Originally designed to train USAFE forces, in 2009 it expanded to include training for Air Forces Africa.

In November 2017, the center added the Joint Terminal Attack Controller (JTAC) domed simulator to its systems. The simulator is designed to support training for JTACs in the performance of terminal control, terminal guidance, close air support, and joint fires operations training.  The simulator uses multiple 4K projectors to display a 270 degree field of view for the JTACs. They use emulated binoculars, night vision devices, and M4 carbine during their training.  The center plans to use the simulator in future large scale exercises including Spartan Eagle Exercises that include airmen stationed stateside.

In September 2016 the other units of the 86th Mission Support Group included the 86th Communications Squadron, 700th Contracting Squadron, 86th Security Forces Squadron, 569th U.S. Forces Police Squadron, the 86th and 786th Force Support Squadrons, the Deployment Transition Center, the 2nd Air Postal Squadron and the Airman Leadership School.

Lineage
 Constituted as the United States Air Forces in Europe Warrior Preparation Center on 12 August 1983
 Activated on 18 August 1983

Stations
 Einsiedlerhof Air Station, 18 August 1983 – present

Assignments
 86th Combat Support Group, 18 August 1983
 377th Combat Support Wing, 14 June 1985
 86th Support Group (later 86th Mission Support Group), 1 May 1991
 435th Air Base Wing, 15 January 2004
 86th Mission Support Group, 16 July 2009 – present

References

Notes

External links
Einsiedlerhof Air Station

Centers of the United States Air Force
Training units of the United States Air Force
Military units and formations established in 1983